There were 15 female and 48 male athletes representing the country at the 2000 Summer Paralympics.

Medalists

See also
Italy at the 2000 Summer Olympics
Italy at the Paralympics

References

Bibliography

External links
International Paralympic Committee

Nations at the 2000 Summer Paralympics
Paralympics
2000